Andrew Stuart Cuthbertson (January 14, 1873 – February 1, 1933) was an American politician and lawyer.

Biography
Cuthbertson was born in Ironton, Missouri. He moved with his parents to Bunker Hill, Illinois in 1873. He went to the public schools and to Bunker Hill Academy. He studied law and was admitted to the Illinois bar in 1897. He was also involved in the banking business. Cuthbertson served on the Bunker Hill Board of Education and was president of the board of education. He also served as a trustee of Shurtleff College. He was involved with the Republican Party. Cuthbertson served in the Illinois Senate from 1921 to 1933. Cuthbertson died from cancer at his home in Bunker Hill, Illinois.

References

1873 births
1933 deaths
People from Ironton, Missouri
People from Macoupin County, Illinois
Illinois lawyers
School board members in Illinois
Republican Party Illinois state senators
Deaths from cancer in Illinois